George W. Streepy Stadion is an association football stadium in Paramaribo, Suriname. It is home to the SVB Youth League and is operated by the SVB's youth football section. The stadium has a capacity of 3,000 people.

Location
The George W. Streepy Stadium is located in Southwestern part of Paramaribo on the Rode Kruislaan.

History
Named after the former director of the Surinaamse Aluminium Company, the George Streepy Stadium was opened on 17 December 1966 on the Rode Kruislaan. The first match at the stadium was the Paramaribo youth team vs. the Districts youth team. The referee for this match was S. Reemet, with linesmen R. Vyent and R. Redmond. The match ended in a 3–3 draw. The board of directors in 1966 consisted of chairman J. Gersie, secretary A. Hoost and Frits Juda as director of competition. André Kamperveen, R. Belgrave, Mouke Pool and G. Lichtveld were the commissioners. At that time the Surinamese Football Association had only been responsible for the Junior League system, taking control of the entire youth system across the country in 1965. The first youth teams to become tenants of the George Streepy Stadium were Coronie Boys, Jai-Hind, Leo Victor, Robinhood, Nautico, Transvaal, Tuna and Voorwaarts. The first Junior League champions were Transvaal (1966), Tuna (1967) and Voorwaarts (1968). In 2011, the stadium was transferred to the Ministry of Sports and Youth Affairs.

References

Football venues in Paramaribo
Buildings and structures in Paramaribo